Rabbi Curtis E Cassell, born Kurt Kassell (8 November 1912 – 8 October 1998), was a rabbi in Germany, the United Kingdom and Rhodesia (now  Zimbabwe). He came to the United Kingdom in 1939 as a refugee from Nazi Germany and became a British citizen in 1946.

Cassell graduated from the Hochschule für die Wissenschaft des Judentums in Berlin and received his semicha in 1936 from Rabbi Leo Baeck.

He was rabbi at the synagogue in Frankfurt an der Oder in succession to Ignaz Maybaum and, after coming to Britain and serving in the Royal Pioneer Corps, became minister at Glasgow Reform Synagogue from 1944 to 1948 and second minister at West London Synagogue from 1948 to 1957. From 1957 to 1977 he was rabbi of the Progressive Jewish Congregation in Bulawayo, Rhodesia (now Zimbabwe). In the late 1980s he was visiting rabbi to Bristol & West Progressive Synagogue.

Curtis Cassell and his wife Cecilia had two sons: Charles Elias (Charlie), who was born in 1939 and David, born in 1947.

He died on 8 October 1998 and is buried at Golders Green Jewish Cemetery.

References

1912 births
1998 deaths
20th-century German rabbis
British Reform rabbis
Burials at Golders Green Jewish Cemetery
Jewish emigrants from Nazi Germany to the United Kingdom
Jews and Judaism in Berlin
West London Synagogue
British Army personnel of World War II
Royal Pioneer Corps soldiers